There are 102 counties in Illinois. The largest of these by population is Cook County, home to Chicago and the second-most populous county in the United States, while the smallest is Hardin County. The largest by land area is McLean County while the smallest is Putnam County. Illinois's FIPS state code is 17 and its postal abbreviation is IL.

What is now Illinois was claimed as part of Illinois County, Virginia, between 1778 and 1782. Modern-day county formation dates to 1790 when the area was part of the Northwest Territory; two counties—St. Clair and Knox—were created at that time. Knox would later become a county in Indiana and is unrelated to the current Knox County in Illinois, while St. Clair would become the oldest county in Illinois. 15 counties had been created by the time Illinois achieved statehood in 1818. The last county, Ford County, was created in 1859. Cook County, established in 1831 and named for the early Illinois Attorney General Daniel Pope Cook, contained the absolute majority of the state's population in the first half of the 20th century and retains more than 40% of it .

Most counties in Illinois were named after early American leaders, especially of the American Revolutionary War, as well as soldiers from the Battle of Tippecanoe and the War of 1812. Some are named after natural features or counties in other states. Some are named for early Illinois leaders. Two counties are named for Native American tribes, and one bears the name of a plant used as a food source by Native Americans. While it does have a Lincoln city, Illinois does not have a county named after its favorite son, Abraham Lincoln; it does, however, have a Douglas County (founded 1859) named after his political rival Stephen A. Douglas. It also has Calhoun County (founded 1825), named after John C. Calhoun, outspoken for his pro-slavery and pro-southern views in the years preceding the American Civil War. Several of the counties are named after Southerners, reflecting the fact that Illinois was for a short time part of Virginia, and settled in its early years by many Southerners. No counties are named after heroes of the Civil War, mainly because the counties were all named before that war. The state does have a Lee County (founded 1839) named after Henry Lee III, the father of Robert E. Lee, who at one time served in Illinois. Illinois also has two counties named after the same person, New York governor DeWitt Clinton (DeWitt County, and Clinton County).

Information on the FIPS county code, county seat, year of establishment, origin, etymology, population, area and map of each county is included in the table below.

Counties
Note: the links in the FIPS County Code column are to the United States Census Bureau page for that county.

|}

Defunct counties
 Dane County was renamed in 1840 to the current Christian County.
 The original Knox County, Illinois, became extinct with the formation of the Illinois Territory in 1809 - or, more precisely, it became Knox County, Indiana. The modern Knox County, Illinois was formed much later and was not a part of the original Knox County.

See also

 List of census-designated places in Illinois
 List of cities in Illinois
 List of Illinois townships
 List of precincts in Illinois
 List of towns and villages in Illinois
 List of unincorporated communities in Illinois
 National Association of Counties
 National Register of Historic Places listings in Illinois

Notes

References

External links

 Census 2000 U.S. Gazetteer Files
 Illinois Association of County Board Members
 Illinois Association of County Officials
 Illinois City/County Management Association

Counties
Illinois, counties in